Rita Nakashima Brock (born April 1950 in Fukuoka, Japan) is an American feminist scholar, Protestant theologian, activist, and non-profit organization leader. She is Senior Vice President for Moral Injury Programs at Volunteers of America, headquartered in Alexandria, Virginia, and a Commissioned Minister in the Christian Church (Disciples of Christ).

Early life
The daughter of Ayako Nakashima and a U.S. Army soldier from Dorado, Puerto Rico, Clemente Morales Torres, she was raised by her mother and grandparents until October 1952, when her mother married Roy Grady Brock, a U.S. Army soldier and veteran of World War II. Her legal name was Rita Nakashima until Roy Brock adopted her in 1958, when her name changed to Rita Brock. The period of her life in Japan and her first thirty years in the U.S. is covered by her theological memoir, Proverbs of Ashes: Violence, Redemptive Suffering and the Search for What Saves Us, co-authored with Rebecca Ann Parker.

Early career
Brock has a B.A, from Chapman University (1972) and holds the Rel. M., degree from the Claremont School of Theology (1974), and the M.A. (1980), and Ph.D. (1988) in Philosophy of Religion and Theology from the Claremont Graduate University in California.

Brock is the first Asian American woman to earn a doctorate in theology. She was associated with the Pacific Asian Center for Theology and Strategies (PACTS) at the Pacific School of Religion in Berkeley, California, from 1978 to 1999, and is a founder of and an emerita faculty advisor for the Pacific, Asian, North American Asian Women in Theology and Ministry beginning in 1984.

From 1980 to 1981, Brock was an adjunct instructor in biblical studies at Scripps College. Her first full-time teaching appointment was as assistant professor of religion at Jarvis Christian College in Hawkins, Texas, a historically black college in her denomination (1981–82). She later taught religion for a year (1983–84) at Valparaiso University.

In 1984, Brock was hired for a teaching position in philosophy and religion at Stephens College in Columbia, Missouri. In her second year, she became the Women's Studies program director (1985–89) and partnered with Planned Parenthood in annual Roe v. Wade events and offering classes in reproductive rights and freedoms. She completed her doctoral dissertation in 1987 and was mentored in its completion by Bernard Loomer. She graduated in June 1988 with her Ph.D. Her doctoral advisor was John B. Cobb, a leading figure in Process Theology. The revised manuscript was published by Crossroads Press in November 1988 as the winner of the publisher's award for the best manuscript of the year in Women's Studies. Released as Journeys By Heart: A Christology of Erotic Power, it was the second book-length feminist Christology and the first work in feminist theology to use the concept of erotic power found in the works of Audre Lorde and Haunani-Kay Trask.

Mid-career
From 1989 to 1990, Brock taught religion and women's studies at Pacific Lutheran University in Tacoma, Washington. In March 1989, she was offered the Endowed Chair in the Humanities at Hamline University in St. Paul, Minnesota, where she began teaching that fall. She became a professor and received tenure in her seven years there. In 1991, she worked with Twin Cities Asian Americans, such as writer David Mura and activist Valerie Lee, to create the Asian American Renaissance, an organization that used the arts to educate the public about racism against Asian Americans and the contributions of Asian Americans in the arts and humanities. This organizational work became a basis for the creation of the first humanities conference about Asian Americans ever held in the Twin Cities in 1996, called "The Other Half of the Basket", with a grant she received from the Minnesota Humanities Commission.

In 1996, Brock published her second, award-winning book with co-author Susan Brooks Thistlethwaite, Casting Stones: Prostitution and Liberation in Asia and the United States (Fortress), which won the Catholic Press Award in Gender Studies. It was the first work in feminist theology to address the topic of sex work and justice.

From 1997 to 1999,   Brock directed the Bunting Institute at Radcliffe College, founded in 1959 by Mary Ingraham Bunting to advance the careers of professional women in all fields. In the fall of 1999, Radcliffe merged with Harvard as the Radcliffe Institute for Advanced Study and Brock was named the first director of the Radcliffe Fellowship Program at Harvard University.
 
After her time at Radcliffe, Brock was a fellow at the Harvard Divinity School Center for Values in Public Life from 2001 to 2002 and then a visiting scholar at the Starr King School for the Ministry at the Graduate Theological Union in Berkeley from 2002 to 2012. She was also a blogger for the Huffington Post Religion section from 2008 to 2016.

With her move to Berkeley in May 2002, Brock began a second book project with Rebecca Parker which would become the 2008 work, Saving Paradise: How Christianity Traded Love of This World for Crucifixion and Empire (Beacon). It was selected by Publishers Weekly as one of the best books in religion in 2008. Released in 2012 in the UK as Saving Paradise: Recovering Christianity’s Forgotten Love for This Earth (Canterbury Press), it was selected as the theme book for the 2012 Greenbelt Festival in Cheltenham, England.

Late in 2008, Brock began working with Gabriella Lettini on the Truth Commission on Conscience in War, which was held at the Riverside Church in New York in March 2010. In response to feedback from the Truth Commission, Brock and Lettini wrote Soul Repair: Recovering from Moral Injury After War (Beacon, 2012), one of the first books written on moral injury. Brock, with a grant from the Lilly Endowment, Inc., co-founded the Soul Repair Center in 2012 at Brite Divinity School  at Texas Christian University, and directed it until May 2017.

Later career
In 2015, Brock's Soul Repair Center work was increasingly supported by Volunteers of America (VOA). In June 2017, Brock accepted the position of Senior Vice President and Director of the Shay Moral Injury Center at Volunteers of America, named in honor of VA retired psychiatrist and noted scholar of moral injury Jonathan Shay.

Brock's work involves assisting VOA's affiliates across the U.S. in implementing moral injury programs and working nationally on new moral injury programs that further the mission of caring for those at risk.

Publications
Brock has co-authored several books and published various contributions primarily on moral injury, theology and culture, feminist theology, sexuality and religion. Her books are:

(with Gabriella Lettini) Soul Repair: Recovering from Moral Injury After War (Boston: Beacon Press, 2012).
(with Rebecca Ann Parker) Saving Paradise: Recovering Christianity’s Forgotten Love for This Earth (Canterbury Press UK, 2012).
(with Rebecca Ann Parker) Saving Paradise: How Christianity Traded Love of This World for Crucifixion and Empire (Boston: Beacon Press, 2008).
(with Rebecca Ann Parker) Proverbs of Ashes: Violence, Redemptive Suffering and the Search for What Saves Us (Boston: Beacon Press, 2001).
(with Susan Brooks Thistlewaite) Casting Stones: Prostitution and Liberation in Asia and the United States (Minneapolis: Fortress Press, 1996). 
Journeys By Heart: A Christology of Erotic Power (New York: Crossroad Press, 1988).

References

External links
 Volunteers of America bio

Japanese emigrants to the United States
Japanese people of American descent
American writers of Japanese descent
Writers from Fukuoka (city)
American adoptees
Chapman University alumni
Claremont Graduate University alumni
Stephens College faculty
Valparaiso University faculty
Radcliffe College faculty
American women writers
American theologians
1950 births
Living people
American women academics
Members of the Jesus Seminar